Jon Giuseppe Drever (born 29 June 1979) is a British director, producer and screenwriter, mostly working in comedy genre. He is best known for his collaborations with comedian Brett Goldstein, which include the low-budget feature film SuperBob (2015).

Career 
Together with his business partner, Orlando von Einsiedel, Drever co-founded the production company, Grain Media, which produced the Academy Award, Emmy and BAFTA-nominated feature-length documentary Virunga (2014), released on Netflix. He sold his half of the company in 2018 to concentrate on making comedy, working with comedy stars like Ross Noble, Aisling Bea, Diane Morgan, Joe Wilkinson, Javone Prince and more.

His directorial feature debut, SuperBob, was released in 2015 and starred Brett Goldstein (with whom he went to the same school in Sutton) as a Peckham postman-turned-superhero and Catherine Tate as his boss. It received four-star reviews from The Times, Evening Standard, Empire and Den of Geek. Drever described the film as "a gentle, upbeat, positive and funny romantic story about a man who learns to fight for what's important".

Drever and Goldstein continued working together after SuperBob, making short films Bullet to the Heart (2016), co-starring Aisling Bea, and Spectre of Shame (2018), with Goldstein as James Bond attending a sex addiction meeting.

Filmography

Awards and nominations

References

External links 

 
 Jon Drever at British Comedy Guide

Living people
1979 births
British screenwriters
British directors
British producers
British film directors
British film producers